Loren Coleman (born July 12, 1947) is an American cryptozoologist who has written over 40 books on a number of topics, including the pseudoscience and subculture of cryptozoology.

Early life

Coleman was born in Norfolk, Virginia, and grew up in Decatur, Illinois. He was the oldest of four children. His father was a firefighter and his mother a homemaker. He graduated in 1965 from MacArthur High School. He studied anthropology and zoology at Southern Illinois University at Carbondale, and psychiatric social work at the Simmons College School of Social Work in Boston.  He did further studies in doctoral-level anthropology at Brandeis University and sociology at the University of New Hampshire. Coleman taught at New England universities from 1980 to 2004, having also been a senior researcher at the Edmund S. Muskie School of Public Policy from 1983 to 1996, before retiring from teaching to write, lecture, and consult.

Cryptozoology
Coleman writes on popular culture, animal mysteries, folklore, and cryptozoology. An editor of the Skeptical Inquirer said,
"among monster hunters, Loren's one of the more reputable, but I'm not convinced that what cryptozoologists seek is actually out there." He has appeared on television and radio interviews about cryptids. He has written articles and books on cryptozoology and other Fortean topics.Coleman has carried out fieldwork throughout North America regarding sightings, trace evidence, and Native peoples' traditions of Sasquatch and other possible cryptids. He has written on Yeti and Bigfoot expedition sponsor Tom Slick and appeared on NPR discussing the death of Grover Krantz.

Paraview Press introduced a series of books, "Loren Coleman Presents" in 2004. Coleman wrote introductions to volumes in the series.

Coleman contributed to the exhibition "Cryptozoology: Out of Time Place Scale," shown at Bates College Museum of Art (June 24 - October 8, 2006) and at the H & R Block Artspace at the Kansas City Art Institute (October 28 - December 20, 2006). Coleman is also a contributor/coauthor of the 2006 Bates exhibition catalogue and book, Cryptozoology: Out of Time Place Scale. He also wrote the essay "Cryptids" for Alexis Rockman.

International Cryptozoology Museum
Coleman established a Cryptozoology Museum in 2003 in Portland, Maine. The first downtown location for the museum opened in November 2009, occupying the rear of The Green Hand Bookshop, a Portland general used bookshop specializing in science fiction, fantasy, and other forms of Gothic fiction. On October 30, 2011, two years after moving onto Congress Street, it re-opened in a much larger space around the corner at 11 Avon Street, although it was still located in the Trelawny Building. The museum then moved again in the summer of 2016, opening in July on Thompson's Point, where it resides now.

Artwork by University of Southern Maine students - Coleman's former workplace - were installed in 2019.

Criticism

Justin Mullis criticized Coleman's assumption that about a 1955 incident in which an Indiana woman was pulled underwater by something she did not see. Coleman claimed it was caused by a half human, half fish creature called a "merbeing". Mullis pointed to Coleman's reference to The Creature from the Black Lagoon as an example of "how cryptozoologists think about science fiction and its relationship to the natural world"."Coleman has clearly used a scene from the film to prematurely solve an unexplained event, ignoring more plausible explanations, such as the possibility that Mrs. Johnson was attacked by a large fish or turtle or caught her leg on a submerged log. He also ignores the fact that Johnson’s story appeared at the same time the Black Lagoon trilogy of films was being released in theaters."Science writer Sharon A. Hill disagrees with Coleman's assertions that cryptozoology is "scientific and skeptically minded". Hill criticized Coleman's Cryptomundo website, saying that members "show blatant disdain for scientists and investigators critical of their claims".

In reviewing a book by Grover Krantz, Skeptical Inquirer editor Robert Boston said of Coleman and Jerome Clark's book Creatures of the Outer Edge,  "Clark and Coleman are every bit as gullible as Krantz, but at least they know how to spin a monster yarn so that the reader gets an occasional chill".

The Copycat Effect
Coleman has a master's degree in psychiatric social work and was a consultant for the Maine Youth Suicide Program for nearly a decade. He authored several manuals and trained over 40,000 professionals and paraprofessionals statewide. A specific concern continues to be cases of murder-suicide among the young as well as the possibility of clusters (e.g., teen suicides, school shootings, workplace violence, and domestic terrorism) and the influence of media coverage, leading to his writing the books Suicide Clusters and The Copycat Effect. He has been called on for statements in the aftermath of school shootings and how best to respond to the problem, mostly by the Canadian media.

BibliographyThe Field Guide to Bigfoot and Other Mystery Primates (NY: Anomalist Books, 2006)The Unidentified & Creatures of the Outer Edge: The Early Works of Jerome Clark and Loren Coleman (NY: Anomalist Books, 2006)Weird Ohio with James Willis and Andrew Henderson (New York: Barnes and Noble, 2005)The Copycat Effect  (New York: Paraview Pocket-Simon & Schuster, 2004)The Field Guide to Lake Monsters, Sea Serpents and Other Mystery Denizens of the Deep with Patrick Huyghe (NY: Tarcher-Penguin, 2003)BIGFOOT!: The True Story of Apes in America (NY: Paraview Pocket-Simon & Schuster, 2003)Tom Slick: True Life Encounters in Cryptozoology (Fresno: Craven Street/Linden Press, 2002)Mothman and Other Curious Encounters (NY: Paraview, 2002)Mysterious America: The Revised Edition (NY: Paraview, 2001)HB 2004.Cryptozoology A to Z: The Encyclopedia of Loch Monsters, Sasquatch, Chupacabras, and Other Authentic Mysteries of Nature with Jerome Clark (NY: Simon & Schuster, 1999)The Field Guide to Bigfoot, Yeti and Other Mystery Primates Worldwide with Patrick Huyghe (NY: HarperCollins, 1999)Suicide Clusters'' (Faber & Faber, 1987)

References

External links

Coleman's Cryptozoology Museum
CryptoZooNews

1947 births
American fortean writers
Bigfoot
Brandeis University alumni
Cryptozoologists
Living people
Simmons University alumni
Southern Illinois University Carbondale alumni
University of New Hampshire alumni
University of Southern Maine faculty
Writers from Decatur, Illinois